The Saugatucket River is a river in the U.S. state of Rhode Island. It flows approximately 13 km (8 mi). There are three dams along the river's length.

Course
The river begins in a small pond east of Deer Ridge Drive in North Kingstown. From there, it flows south through South Kingstown to its mouth at Silver Spring Cove, south of the village of Wakefield.

Crossings
Below is a list of all crossings over the Saugatucket River. The list starts at the headwaters and goes downstream.

South Kingstown
Mooresfield Road (RI 138)
Broad Rock Road
Saugatucket Road
Kersey Road
Kingstown Road (RI 108)
Church Street
Main Street
Silver Lake Avenue
U.S. 1

Tributaries
Fresh Meadow and Rocky Brooks are the only two named tributaries of the Saugatucket River, though it has many unnamed streams that also feed it.

See also
List of rivers in Rhode Island
Narragansett Bay

References

Maps from the United States Geological Survey

Rivers of Washington County, Rhode Island
North Kingstown, Rhode Island
South Kingstown, Rhode Island
Rivers of Rhode Island